D Korungthang is a politician from Maring tribe of Manipur. He was elected from Tengnoupal Assembly constituency in 2012 and 2017 Manipur Legislative Assembly election from Indian National Congress and had also served briefly as Cabinet Minister in Manipur Legislative Assembly from 2016 to 2017.

References 

Living people
Indian National Congress politicians from Manipur
Manipur MLAs 2017–2022
Manipur MLAs 2012–2017
1958 births
Naga people